Ruellia eriocalyx is a plant native to the Cerrado vegetation of Brazil.

eriocalyx
Flora of Brazil